Wright County is a county located in the southern portion of the U.S. state of Missouri. As of the 2010 census, the population was 18,815. Its county seat is Hartville. The county was officially organized on January 29, 1841, and is named after Silas Wright (D-New York), a former Congressman, U.S. Senator and Governor of New York.

As of the 2020 United States Census, the U.S. Census Bureau recognized the mean center of the United States population to be within the County, near the community of Hartville.

History
Wright County is bordered by Laclede County on the north, Texas County on the east, Douglas County on the south, and Webster County on the west. It is in the part of the state considered Southwest Missouri. Formed from part of Pulaski County on January 29, 1841, Wright County was named in honor of Silas Wright, a prominent New York Democrat. The county seat of Hartville was named after pioneer settler Isaac Hart. Wright County lost part of its land in 1845 to Texas County, in 1849 to Laclede, and in 1855 a big chunk to Webster.

It appears there were no Native American settlements early in the area, although the wandering Delawares, Shawnees, and Piankashaws did come through. Early white settlers were in the county in 1836 and were probably hunters. Earliest known settlers (by 1840) were Samuel Thompson, Robert Moore, John W. Burns, Jeff and Robert Montgomery, Benjamin Stephens, James Young, William Franklin, Isham Pool, and the Tuckers, according to Goodspeed.

The county has been devastated several times by storms. A tornado that swept through Southwest Missouri that devastated Webster County on April 18, 1880. A flood occurred April 22–23, 1885. Another tornado on May 8, 1888, did considerable damage, as did a hailstorm near the same time that reportedly left hail 3-4 inches deep and in drifts 5–8 feet high, after falling for two hours. Goodspeed gives great accounts of these storms, as well as others.

A good-sized portion of the county is located in the Mark Twain National Forest. The Gasconade River and its tributaries flow through the county, as well allowing for great recreational opportunities.

Geography

Wright County lies within the Salem Plateau region of the Ozarks. The bulk of the county is drained by the north flowing Gasconade River and its tributary streams. The southern edge of the county is drained by the south flowing headwaters of North Fork River. The terrain is moderately hilly.

Adjacent counties
Laclede County (north)
Webster County (west)
Douglas County (south)
Texas County (east)

Major highways
 U.S. Route 60
 Route 5
 Route 38
 Route 95

National protected area
Mark Twain National Forest (part)

Demographics

As of the census of 2000, there were 17,955 people, 7,081 households, and 5,020 families residing in the county. The population density was 26 people per square mile (10/km2). There were 7,957 housing units at an average density of 12 per square mile (4/km2). The racial makeup of the county was 97.61% White, 0.28% Black or African American, 0.66% Native American, 0.14% Asian, 0.01% Pacific Islander, 0.27% from other races, and 1.04% from two or more races. Approximately 0.77% of the population were Hispanic or Latino of any race.

There were 7,081 households, out of which 33.10% had children under the age of 18 living with them, 58.50% were married couples living together, 8.80% had a female householder with no husband present, and 29.10% were non-families. 26.30% of all households were made up of individuals, and 13.30% had someone living alone who was 65 years of age or older. The average household size was 2.50 and the average family size was 3.01.

In the county, the population was spread out, with 27.20% under the age of 18, 8.20% from 18 to 24, 25.30% from 25 to 44, 22.80% from 45 to 64, and 16.50% who were 65 years of age or older. The median age was 38 years. For every 100 females there were 94.30 males. For every 100 females age 18 and over, there were 90.60 males.

The median income for a household in the county was $30,685, and the median income for a family was $37,139. Males had a median income of $24,876 versus $17,608 for females. The per capita income for the county was $16,319. About 17.30% of families and 21.70% of the population were below the poverty line, including 29.10% of those under age 18 and 17.60% of those age 65 or over.

Religion
According to the Association of Religion Data Archives County Membership Report (2000), Wright County is a part of the Bible Belt with evangelical Protestantism being the majority religion. The most predominant denominations among residents in Wright County who adhere to a religion are Southern Baptists (49.92%), National Association of Free Will Baptists (19.84%), and Pentecostals (7.55%).

2020 Census

Education
Of adults 25 years of age and older in Wright County, 71.1% possesses a high school diploma or higher while 9.8% holds a bachelor's degree or higher as their highest educational attainment.

Public schools
Hartville R-II School District - Hartville
Grovespring Elementary School - Grovespring - (K-06)
Hartville Elementary School (PK-06)
Hartville High School (07-12)
Mansfield R-IV School District - Mansfield
Wilder Elementary School (PK-05)
Mansfield Jr. High School (06-08)
Mansfield High School (09-12)
Mountain Grove R-III School District - Mountain Grove
Mountain Grove Elementary School (K-04)
Mountain Grove Middle School (05-08)
Mountain Grove High School (09-12)
Norwood R-I School District - Norwood
Norwood Elementary School (PK-04)
Norwood Middle School (05-08)
Norwood High School (09-12)
Manes R-V School District - Manes
Manes Elementary School (K-08)

Private schools
Mountain Grove Christian Academy - Mountain Grove - (PK-12) - Non-denominational Christian
Liberty Faith Christian Academy - Norwood - (K-12) - Non-denominational Christian

Alternative and vocational schools
Ozark Mountain Technical Center - Mountain Grove - (09-12) - Vocational/Technical
Ozark Regional Juvenile Detention Center - Mountain Grove - (05-12) - Juvenile Hall
Skyview State School - Mountain Grove - (K-12) - A school for handicapped students and those with other special needs.

Public libraries
Wright County Library

Politics

Local

The Republican Party completely controls politics at the local level in Wright County. Republicans hold every elected position in the county.

State
All of Wright County is a part off Missouri's 141st District in the Missouri House of Representatives and is currently represented by Hannah Kelly (R-Mountain Grove). 

All of Wright County is a part of Missouri's 33rd District in the Missouri Senate and is currently represented by State Senator Mike Cunningham (R-Rogersville)

Federal

Wright County is included in Missouri's 8th Congressional District and is currently represented by Jason T. Smith (R-Salem) in the U.S. House of Representatives. Smith won a special election on Tuesday, June 4, 2013, to finish out the remaining term of U.S. Representative Jo Ann Emerson (R-Cape Girardeau). Emerson announced her resignation a month after being reelected with over 70 percent of the vote in the district. She resigned to become CEO of the National Rural Electric Cooperative.

Political culture

Like most counties situated in Southwest Missouri, Wright County is a Republican stronghold in presidential elections. George W. Bush carried Wright County in 2000 and 2004 by more than two-to-one margins, and like many other rural counties throughout Missouri, Wright County strongly favored John McCain over Barack Obama in 2008, Mitt Romney in 2012, and Donald Trump over Hillary Clinton in 2016. No Democratic presidential nominee has won Wright County in more than 80 years.

Like most rural areas throughout the Bible Belt in Southwest Missouri, voters in Wright County traditionally adhere to socially and culturally conservative principles which tend to strongly influence their Republican leanings. In 2004, Missourians voted on a constitutional amendment to define marriage as the union between a man and a woman—it overwhelmingly passed Wright County with 86.28 percent of the vote. The initiative passed the state with 71 percent of support from voters as Missouri became the first state to ban same-sex marriage. In 2006, Missourians voted on a constitutional amendment to fund and legalize embryonic stem cell research in the state—it failed in Wright County with 64.84 percent voting against the measure. The initiative narrowly passed the state with 51 percent of support from voters as Missouri became one of the first states in the nation to approve embryonic stem cell research. Despite Wright County's longstanding tradition of supporting socially conservative platforms, voters in the county have a penchant for advancing populist causes like increasing the minimum wage. In 2006, Missourians voted on a proposition (Proposition B) to increase the minimum wage in the state to $6.50 an hour—it passed Wright County with 70.99 percent of the vote. The proposition strongly passed every single county in Missouri with 78.99 percent voting in favor as the minimum wage was increased to $6.50 an hour in the state. During the same election, voters in five other states also strongly approved increases in the minimum wage.

Missouri presidential preference primary (2008)

Former Governor Mike Huckabee (R-Arkansas) received more votes, a total of 1,878, than any candidate from either party in Wright County during the 2008 presidential primary. He also received more votes than the total number of votes cast in the entire Democratic Primary in Wright County. Wright County was Huckabee's strongest county in Missouri.

Communities

Cities

Hartville (county seat)
Mansfield
Mountain Grove (partly in Texas County)
Norwood

Unincorporated communities

 Astoria
 Boyer
 Cedar Gap
 Dawson
 Duggan
 Duncan
 Fuson
 Graff
 Grovespring
 Jerktail
 Macomb
 Manes
 Odin
 Owens
 Rayborn
 Smittle
 St. George
 Talmage
 Umpire

See also
National Register of Historic Places listings in Wright County, Missouri

References

Further reading
 History of Laclede, Camden, Dallas, Webster, Wright, Texas, Pulaski, Phelps, and Dent counties, Missouri (1889) full text

External links
 Digitized 1930 Plat Book of Wright County  from University of Missouri Division of Special Collections, Archives, and Rare Books

 
1841 establishments in Missouri
Populated places established in 1841